is a Japanese footballer currently playing as a defender for Renofa Yamaguchi.

Career statistics

Club

Notes

References

External links

1998 births
Living people
People from Chiba (city)
Association football people from Chiba Prefecture
Japanese footballers
Association football defenders
J2 League players
Renofa Yamaguchi FC players